Gmina Księżpol is a rural gmina (administrative district) in Biłgoraj County, Lublin Voivodeship, in eastern Poland.

Villages
Gmina Księżpol contains the villages and settlements of Borki, Budzyń, Bukowiec, Gliny, Kamionka, Korchów Drugi, Korchów Pierwszy, Księżpol, Kuchy-Kolonia, Kulasze, Marianka, Markowicze, Markowicze-Cegielnia, Nowy Lipowiec, Nowy Majdan, Pawlichy, Płusy, Przymiarki, Rakówka, Rogale, Stare Króle, Stary Lipowiec, Stary Majdan, Telikały, Zanie, Zawadka and Zynie.

Neighbouring gminas
Gmina Księżpol is bordered by the gminas of Aleksandrów, Biłgoraj, Biszcza, Łukowa and Tarnogród.

References
Polish official population figures 2006

Ksiezpol
Biłgoraj County